Hiroko Kuwata and Zhu Lin were the defending champions, but Zhu chose not to participate. Kuwata played alongside Valeria Savinykh as the top seeds, but they lost in the final to the second seeds Priscilla Hon and Valeria Savinykh in the final, 6–3, 6–4.

Seeds

Draw

References
Main Draw

Kentucky Bank Tennis Championships - Doubles
Lexington Challenger